San Antonio del Norte is a municipality in the Honduran department of La Paz.

Demographics
At the time of the 2013 Honduras census, San Antonio del Norte municipality had a population of 2,725. Of these, 94.42% were Mestizo, 4.33% White, 1.03% Indigenous (0.84% Lenca) and 0.22% Black or Afro-Honduran.

References

Municipalities of the La Paz Department (Honduras)